Chippewa Township is a civil township of Mecosta County in the U.S. state of Michigan.  As of the 2000 census, the township population was 1,239.

Communities
Chippewa Lake is a small community within the township on Chippewa Lake and Lake Street.  A post box only Post Office is located there with the ZIP code 49320.  It had a post office starting in 1870.

Geography

Demographics
As of the census of 2000, there were 1,239 people, 518 households, and 356 families residing in the township. The racial makeup of the township was 97.34% White, 0.16% African American, 0.48% Native American, 0.40% Asian, 0.08% from other races, and 1.53% from two or more races. Hispanic or Latino of any race were 0.32% of the population.

There were 518 households, out of which 25.3% had children under the age of 18 living with them, 56.2% were married couples living together, 7.3% had a female householder with no husband present, and 31.1% were non-families. 25.3% of all households were made up of individuals, and 11.8% had someone living alone who was 65 years of age or older.  The average household size was 2.38 and the average family size was 2.81.

In the township the population was spread out, with 20.7% under the age of 18, 8.3% from 18 to 24, 23.6% from 25 to 44, 28.2% from 45 to 64, and 19.0% who were 65 years of age or older.  The median age was 43 years. For every 100 females, there were 104.1 males.  For every 100 females age 18 and over, there were 102.1 males.

The median income for a household in the township was $33,859, and the median income for a family was $36,563. Males had a median income of $32,778 versus $20,375 for females. The per capita income for the township was $17,336.  About 8.1% of families and 10.0% of the population were below the poverty line, including 11.0% of those under age 18 and 10.1% of those age 65 or over.

References

Notes

Sources

Townships in Mecosta County, Michigan
Townships in Michigan